Perzyny  is a village in the administrative district of Gmina Moskorzew, within Włoszczowa County, Wielkopolskie Voivodeship, in south-central Poland.

References

Villages in Włoszczowa County